Sinkamba Josephat Kandege (born 6 June 1964) is a Tanzanian CCM politician and Member of Parliament for Kalambo constituency since 2010.

References

1968 births
Living people
Tanzanian accountants
Chama Cha Mapinduzi MPs
Tanzanian MPs 2010–2015
Ifunda Secondary School alumni
Usagara Secondary School alumni